There are 24 Grade I listed buildings in the city of Brighton and Hove, England. Queen Elizabeth II granted city status in 2000.

In England, a building or structure is defined as "listed" when it is placed on a statutory register of buildings of "special architectural or historic interest" by the Secretary of State for Culture, Media and Sport, a Government department, in accordance with the Planning (Listed Buildings and Conservation Areas) Act 1990.  English Heritage, a non-departmental public body, acts as an agency of this department to administer the process and advise the department on relevant issues.  There are three grades of listing status: Grade I, the highest, defined as being of "exceptional interest"; Grade II*, "particularly important buildings of more than special interest"; and Grade II, the lowest, used for buildings of "special interest".

Brighton and its westerly neighbour Hove developed independently as fishing villages on the English Channel coastline.  Brighton was founded as a Saxon homestead and had a population of about 400 at the time of the Domesday survey in 1086.  Hove had a long tradition of farming on the fertile downland behind the coast, and was also known for smuggling activity.  Both places were in decline in the mid-17th century; but local doctor Richard Russell's advocacy of drinking and bathing in seawater at Brighton attracted members of Britain's high society and royalty. This included the Prince of Wales, who commissioned architect John Nash to build a house; the result was the city's best-known building, the architecturally eclectic Royal Pavilion.

Helped by its proximity to London, good climate and the royal patronage it enjoyed, Brighton developed rapidly in the early 19th century: the number of houses doubled to about 8,000 between 1820 and 1830.  Three local architects—Charles Busby, Amon Wilds and his son Amon Henry Wilds—were responsible for several innovative, practical and elegant residential developments and public buildings in both Brighton and Hove.  The Kemp Town and Brunswick estates bordered Brighton to the east and west respectively.  The town was thereby joined to Hove, in turn stimulating its growth.  Kemp Town was primarily the work of Barry and Wilds senior, and was conceived as a seven-part design: two sea-facing terraces (Arundel Terrace and Chichester Terrace), a square (Sussex Square) with houses on three sides, and a two-part crescent (Lewes Crescent) joining these sections.  All seven parts are listed at Grade I.  Similarly, the four parts of Brunswick Terrace and the east and west sides of Brunswick Square, which formed the main part of the Wilds and Busby partnership's Brunswick estate, have been awarded Grade I status.

A combination of Victorian enthusiasm for church-building, the importance of churchgoing as part of Brighton's social calendar and a need to provide places for poor people to worship resulted in many churches being built in Brighton and Hove in the 19th century.  Five have a Grade I listing, including one that is no longer in use.  The pleasure pier was another Victorian trend, and Brighton's West Pier is one of only two Grade I-listed piers in England; it is now in ruins after a series of storms and fires caused it to collapse.  After it closed in 1975, a section fell into the sea in 1984, then the Great Storm of 1987 caused more damage.  Partial demolition followed, but in the space of five months from December 2002 it suffered two further collapses and two devastating fires.

In the 20th century, both Brighton and Hove expanded by absorbing surrounding villages, many of which had ancient buildings.  Ovingdean and Stanmer were two such places, and Ovingdean's 12th-century parish church and an early 18th-century mansion in Stanmer Park—now the city's largest expanse of green space—are the oldest Grade I listed buildings in Brighton and Hove.  Sussex University, built on open land near Stanmer as the first new university of the post-war era, was designed by Sir Basil Spence; Falmer House, the main building on the campus, received a Grade I listing in 1993 and is the most recently built Grade I building in the city.

Grade I listed buildings

See also
Buildings and architecture of Brighton and Hove
List of conservation areas in Brighton and Hove

References

Notes

Bibliography

 
Lists of Grade I listed buildings in East Sussex